Henry Howard (March 8, 1833 – May 24, 1894) was a banker and businessman, and served as the mayor of Port Huron, Michigan, and in the Michigan state legislature.

Biography
Henry Howard was born March 8, 1833, in Detroit, Michigan,  the son of John and Nancy Hubbard Howard.  The elder Howard was a grocer and hotelier in Detroit, but the 1834 cholera outbreak convinced him to move his family moved to Port Huron. Once in Port Huron, John Howarn entered the lumber trade and eventually built three sawmills in the city.

Henry Howard received his schooling in Port Huron, and for four years worked in various positions in Port Huron and Detroit. In 1854, Henry Howard joined his father's business, and the two were partners for 26 years until John Howard's retirement in 1877, after which Henry continued the business alone.   Henry Howard was also involved in a number of other businesses, and at one time or another was president of the Port Huron First National Bank, the Port Huron Times Company, the Port Huron Gas Light Co, the Port Huron & Northwestern Railroad, and the Northern Transit Company.

In 1856, Howard married Elizabeth Experience Spalding; the couple had six children, only two of which outlived them: Emily Louise and John Henry.

Howard was an alderman of Port Huron for 14 years, a state representative in 1873 - 1875, and served as Port Huron's mayor in 1882. He ran for state senate, but was defeated by William M. Cline.  He served as Regent of the University of Michigan from 1891 until his death in 1894.

Notes
The Port Huron mayor, banker, lumberman, and state representative Henry Howard is not the same person as the nearly contemporaneous Detroit, Michigan, mayor, banker, lumberman, and state treasurer Henry Howard, despite Palmer's  understandable confusion of the two.   Bingham correctly differentiates the two men in his thumbnail biography.

References

1833 births
1894 deaths
Mayors of places in Michigan
Michigan city council members
Members of the Michigan House of Representatives
Politicians from Detroit
People from Port Huron, Michigan
Regents of the University of Michigan
19th-century American politicians